The 1976–77 Libyan Premier League was the 13th edition of the competition since its inception in 1963.

Classification

Libyan Premier League seasons
Libya
Premier League